Coburn is a surname, and may refer to:

 Abner Coburn, Governor of Maine from 1863 to 1865
 Alvin Langdon Coburn, American photographer
 Bob Coburn, host of the nationally syndicated radio program Rockline
 Braydon Coburn, Canadian hockey player
 Carroll L. Coburn, American farmer and politician
 Catherine Amanda Coburn (1839–1913), American journalist, newspaper editor
 Charles Coburn, American actor
 David Coburn (athletic director), College athletic director
 Donald L. Coburn, American Pulitzer-winning dramatist
 Dorothy Coburn, American actress
 Frank P. Coburn, United States House of Representatives from Wisconsin
 James Coburn, American film actor
 James Coburn (criminal), executed in 1964 in Alabama, United States
 Jo Coburn, BBC political correspondent
 John Coburn (disambiguation)
 Louise Helen Coburn, Maine writer and co-founder of Sigma Kappa sorority
 Norman Coburn, Australian actor
 Pamela Coburn (born 1959), American soprano
 Sara Coburn, BBC business correspondent
 Sarah Coburn (born 1977), American opera singer
 Stephen Coburn, United States Representative from Maine in the 19th century
 Thomas B. Coburn, American religious scholar and writer
 Tom Coburn (1948-2020), American medical doctor, United States Representative and later Senator from Oklahoma

See also
 Cockburn (surname), with the same pronunciation
 Coburn (disambiguation), other uses of the name Coburn

English-language surnames
Surnames of Scottish origin

ru:Кобёрн